Maji Moto is a settlement in Kenya's Narok County.

There is another settlement with the same name (sometimes "Maji Ya Moto") in Baringo County, Kenya.

References 

Populated places in Narok County